Soundless is a 2004 German crime film directed by Mennan Yapo.

Cast 
 Joachim Król - Viktor
 Nadja Uhl - Nina
 Christian Berkel - Lang
 Rudolf Martin - Der junge Polizist
 Lisa Martinek - Die Ermittlerin
 Peter Fitz - Martin Hinrich
  - Der Russe
 Gertraud Jesserer - Grundschullehrerin
 Mehmet Kurtuluş - Sicherheitschef des Russen
  - Killer des Russen
 Jale Arıkan - Freundin des Russen

References

External links 

2004 crime thriller films
2004 films
German crime thriller films
Films about contract killing
German neo-noir films
Films directed by Mennan Yapo
2004 directorial debut films
2000s German films